Phineas Finn is a novel by Anthony Trollope and the name of its leading character. The novel was first published as a monthly serial from October 1867 to May 1868 in St Paul's Magazine. It is the second of the "Palliser" series of novels. Its sequel, Phineas Redux, is the fourth novel in the series. The character of Phineas Finn is said to have been partly inspired by Sir John Pope Hennessy (grandfather of the museum director of the same name), a Roman Catholic from Cork, who was elected as an "Irish Nationalist Conservative" Member of Parliament for King's County in 1859.

It deals with both British parliamentary politics of the 1860s, including voting reform (secret ballot and eliminating rotten boroughs and Irish tenant-right) and Finn's romances with women of fortune, which would secure his financial future.

Synopsis
Finn is the only son of a successful Irish doctor, Dr Malachi Finn of Killaloe, County Clare, who sends him to London to become a lawyer.  He proves to be a lackadaisical student, but being pleasant company and strikingly handsome to boot, he makes many influential friends. One of them, a politician, Barrington Erle, suggests that he stand for Parliament in the coming election.

At first, the idea seems absurd.  Finn is supported solely by a modest allowance from his father, but a stroke of luck clears his path. One of his father's patients is Lord Tulla, a nobleman who controls Loughshane, a little borough that can be contested cheaply.  Lord Tulla has had a falling out with his brother, the long-time officeholder. As a result, while the staunchly Tory lord will not support the Whig Finn, neither will he hamper him. Convincing his sceptical father to provide the funds needed, Finn wins his seat by a small margin.

The closest of his London friends is his mentor, Lady Laura Standish, the daughter of the prominent Whig politician Lord Brentford. As their relationship develops, Finn considers asking for her hand in marriage, despite the great social and financial gulf between them.  Lady Laura senses this, but despite her partiality for the man, monetary considerations and her own political ambitions convince her to marry the dour, extremely wealthy Robert Kennedy instead.

At first devastated, Finn soon recovers and becomes enamoured of a lovely heiress, Violet Effingham.  This proves to be awkward, as both Lady Laura and Lord Brentford vehemently want her to marry (and hopefully tame) Lord Brentford's estranged son, the savage Lord Chiltern. In addition, Lady Laura encourages Finn to become acquainted with her brother. Finn and Chiltern become fast friends, which makes the situation even more uncomfortable.  When Chiltern finds out that Finn is also courting Violet, he becomes infuriated and unreasonably demands that Finn withdraw. When he refuses, Chiltern insists on a duel. This is held in secret at Blankenberg, resulting in Finn being slightly wounded. Eventually, Violet has to choose between her two main suitors; she somewhat fearfully decides in favour of her childhood sweetheart, Chiltern.

Meanwhile, Finn's parliamentary career gets off to a rocky start. Overawed by his august surroundings, he delivers a somewhat incoherent maiden speech. Eventually, however, he becomes accustomed to his situation and grows adept at parliamentary proceedings.  All is not smooth sailing however. When new elections are called, Finn is in a dilemma. Lord Tulla has become reconciled with his brother and Finn seemingly has no chance of re-election. At this point, fortune favours him once again.

Late one night, Finn and Mr Kennedy, now the Chancellor of the Duchy of Lancaster, depart Parliament at the same time.  When they go their separate ways, Finn notices two men who follow his colleague. Suspicious, he takes a shortcut and arrives in time to foil an attempt to garrotte and rob Kennedy.  In gratitude for saving the life of his son-in-law, Lord Brentford offers him the seat for the pocket borough of Loughton. With the nobleman's support, the election is a foregone conclusion.

Finn's heroic feat exacerbates the growing rift between Lady Laura and her husband. Their temperaments clash; Mr Kennedy disapproves of his wife's interest in politics. Moreover, to her intense dismay, Lady Laura finds she has great difficulty suppressing her strong feelings for Finn, and Kennedy becomes suspicious.  Eventually, she becomes so desperately unhappy, she flees to her father's house. (At the end of the novel, Mr Kennedy's legal actions push her to move to the Continent, where the law cannot force her to return to her husband's household.)

In the meantime, Finn makes the acquaintance of a charming, clever foreigner, Madame Max Goesler, the young and beautiful widow of a rich Jewish banker.  More materially, he is appointed to a well-paid government position, in which he excels. It seems as if he is finally secure.

A Reform Act is passed.  This bill eliminates Finn's seat, the borough of Loughton. However, he re-enters Parliament by winning back his earlier seat, Loughshane, the death of its incumbent having conveniently resulted in a rival candidate displeasing to Lord Tulla.

Finn visits Ireland with Mr Joshua Monk, a leading Radical politician and a supporter of increased rights for Irish tenant farmers.  Under Mr Monk's influence, Finn becomes radicalised. At a political meeting in Dublin, Finn argues that a new tenant-right bill should be presented to the Westminster Parliament during the next session. When this happens, the government, of which Finn is a member, does not support it. Finn must therefore choose between his loyalty to the government and his political convictions. He chooses the latter, resigns his government position and retires from politics.

With his political career in shambles, Finn seeks consolation from Madame Max.  In an unexpected development, she offers him her hand and her wealth in marriage. Finn is greatly tempted, but finally returns to Ireland to marry his faithful, long-time sweetheart, Mary Flood Jones. As a parting reward for his hard work, his party obtains for him a comfortable sinecure as a poor-law inspector in Cork at a salary of a thousand pounds a year.

Characters
 Phineas Finn - handsome, 25-year-old, only son of an Irish doctor.
 Lady Laura Standish - friend of Phineas, who is in love with her until she chooses to marry Mr. Kennedy instead.
 Violet Effingham - pretty, an orphan and an heiress; she is a close friend of Lady Laura. 
 Lord Oswald Chiltern - brother of Lady Laura; has a reputation for drinking excessively, gambling and a somewhat violent nature; despite this Lady Laura is very devoted to him.
 Mr. Robert Kennedy
 Lord Brentford - father of Lady Laura and Lord Chiltern, from whom he is estranged.
 Laurence Fitzgibbon
 Barrington Erle
 Mary Flood Jones - 20 years old; friend of Phineas' sister Barbara and in love with Phineas.
 Mrs. Bunce
 Mr. Bunce
 Mr. Low
 Plantagenet Palliser
 Lady Glencora Palliser
 Dr. Malachi Finn - father of six children of whom, Phineas is the only son.

Response
After the publication of Phineas Finn as a book, Trollope was attacked by The Daily Telegraph on 31 March 1869 for his unflattering portrayal of politicians. The character of the demagogue Turnbull was believed to have been based on John Bright.

References

Further reading
 Halperin,  John. "Trollope's Phineas Finn and History." English Studies 59.2 (1978): 121-137.
 Lonergan, Patrick. "The Representation of Phineas Finn: Anthony Trollope's Palliser Series and Victorian Ireland." Victorian Literature and Culture 32.1 (2004): 147-158 online.
 Van Dam, Frederik. "Character and the Career: Anthony Trollope’s Phineas Finn and the rhetoric of the Victorian State." English Text Construction 2.1 (2009): 91-110.

External links 
 
 
 
 

Novels by Anthony Trollope
1867 British novels
Picaresque novels
Novels first published in serial form
Works originally published in British magazines
Works originally published in literary magazines